Highway 941 is a provincial highway in the Canadian province of Saskatchewan. It runs from Highway 904 to the Waterhen Lake First Nation.

The first 16 kilometres of Highway 941 lies within the Meadow Lake Provincial Park. At the 12-kilometre mark is an intersection with Highway 951. The town of Waterhen Lake is 4 km south-east of the intersection, on the border of the Waterhen Lake First Nation. Highway 941 ends 6 km into the Waterhen Lake First Nation at the Waterhen Lake.

See also 
Roads in Saskatchewan
Transportation in Saskatchewan

References 

941